The Ceyhan spring minnow (Pseudophoxinus zekayi) is a species of freshwater fish in the family Cyprinidae. It is found in the Ceyhan River drainage in Turkey.

References

Pseudophoxinus
Endemic fauna of Turkey
Fish described in 2006